The West Mesa is an elevated landmass lying west of the Rio Grande river, stretching from south of Albuquerque northward to Bernalillo in the U.S. state of New Mexico.  

The eastern edge of the West Mesa is defined by an escarpment that borders the Rio Grande floodplain. The West Mesa also serves as the easternmost extent of the Colorado Plateau in this region. A large portion of the West Mesa is part of Petroglyph National Monument and is bisected by Interstate 40 and Historic Route 66. Atrisco Vista (previously named Paseo del Volcan) (NM 347) runs north-south on the West Mesa, connecting I-40/US-66 to Double Eagle II Airport.  

There are numerous subdivisions with new homes being built on the lower portion of the West Mesa as the City of Albuquerque continues to expand further to the west. Further west on the mesa are the mobile home communities of Pajarito, located to the south of I-40, and Lost Horizon, located about 1/2 mile north of I-40 and 3 miles west of the Paseo del Volcan interchange.  

The Bernalillo County Correctional Facility and the Sandia Motor Speedway are located on the West Mesa, several miles south of Interstate 40. The National Weather Service operates a WSR-88D NEXRAD radar site on the West Mesa near Double Eagle II Airport.

Subdivisions

The major subdivisions in the West Mesa area of Albuquerque are:

 Anderson Heights
 Cottonwood Height
 Desert Spring Flower
 Eagle Ranch
 El Rancho Grande
 Grande Heights
 La Luz
 Ladera West
 Laurelwood
 Los Volcanes
 Montecito Estates
 Paradise Greens
 Paradise Hills
 Rancho Sereno
 Rolling Hills
 Saltillo
 Seville
 Skies West
 Stonebridge Pointe
 Stormcloud
 Sunrise
 Taylor Ranch
 The Trails
 Ventana Ranch
 Ventana Ranch West
 Vista Sandia
 Volcano Cliffs
 West Gate (ADDTN 1-12)
 West Gate Heights
 West Gate Vecinos

There are four high schools in the region: Atrisco Heritage High School, Cibola High School, Volcano Vista High School, and West Mesa High School.

Other geographic features located at the West Mesa 

 Double Eagle II Airport
 West Mesa Airport (now defunct)
 Nine Mile Hill
 Village of Lost Horizon, New Mexico|Lost Horizon (part of the former West Mesa Air Force Station)
 Petroglyph National Monument
 Shooting Range Park – a public shooting range owned and operated by the City of Albuquerque
 Bernalillo County Correctional Facility
 Sandia Motor Speedway

See also
 West Mesa murders

References

Mesas of New Mexico
Landforms of Bernalillo County, New Mexico